Surotomycin was an investigational oral antibiotic. This antibiotic was under investigation by Merck & Co (who acquired Cubist Pharmaceuticals) for the treatment of life-threatening Diarrhea, commonly caused by the bacterium Clostridium difficile. After reaching phase III in clinical trials, its production was discontinued in 2017 due to its non-superiority to current therapies.

References

Antibiotics